Dylan Wesley Nkongape Kadji (born 1 September 2003) is an English footballer who plays as a midfielder for Swindon Town on loan from Bristol City of the EFL Championship.

Career

Kadji came through the youth academy at Bristol City and signed a professional contract in November 2021.

2021: Loan to Bath 
Kadji played 6 matches on loan for Bath City F.C. in the 2021-22 season, making his debut on 26 December 2021 against Chippenham Town. Kadji started the move that led to the fourth goal in a 4-1 win for his new club. His home debut for Bath at Twerton Park came a week later in a 2-0 win on 2 January, 2022 again against Chippenham Town.

2022:Senior Bristol City debut 
Although he was still training with the Bristol City first team even whilst on loan with Bath, Kadji particularly impressed manager Nigel Pearson and was singled out for praise after training with the first team squad in pre-season camp during the summer of 2022.
Pearson was quick to downplay too much pressure being put on the young player's development as Kadji had suffered from injuries that meant he had to sit out sections of their summer tour of Austria. On 24 August, 2022 Kadji opened the scoring 7 minutes into his Bristol City senior debut, against Wycombe Wanderers at Adams Park in an EFL Cup second round match, which finished in a 3-1 victory for his side.

2023:Loan to Swindon 
On 31 January, 2023 Kadji joined Swindon Town on a six-month loan deal. He made his first league start for Swindon on February 4, 2023 against Newport County, a 2-1 defeat that also marked the first league match in charge of Swindon for new manager Jody Morris.

Style of play
Bristol city manager Nigel Pearson said after his debut that Kadji had “really good attributes for the modern game. He's a good mover, he's got decent vision and ability."

Personal life
Born in England, Kadji is of Cameroonian descent.

References

External links
 

2003 births
Living people
English footballers
English people of Cameroonian descent
Association football midfielders
Bristol City F.C. players
Bath City F.C. players